Leo Frank Katkaveck (April 17, 1923 – May 6, 2006) was an American professional basketball and baseball player. Katkaveck was selected in the 1948 BAA draft by the Washington Capitols after a collegiate career at North Carolina State. He played for the Capitols in 1948–49 and 1949–50 before retiring from basketball.

Katkaveck was also a minor league baseball player. Between 1948 and 1951, he played for the Warsaw Red Sox, Raleigh Capitals, Goldsboro Goldbugs, and Roanoke Rapids Jays.

BAA/NBA career statistics

Regular season

Playoffs

References

External links

1923 births
2006 deaths
American men's basketball players
Baseball players from North Carolina
Basketball players from North Carolina
Goldsboro Goldbugs players
Guards (basketball)
NC State Wolfpack baseball players
NC State Wolfpack men's basketball players
Raleigh Capitals players
Roanoke Rapids Jays players
Warsaw Red Sox players
Washington Capitols draft picks
Washington Capitols players